Challenge Roth is a triathlon race organised by in and around Roth bei Nürnberg, Bavaria, Germany. It is held annually in July.

The Ironman distance (140.6 miles / 226.2 kilometers) version of the race has been held since 1990, and the short distance version since 1984. It was part of the Ironman series until 2001. It has been held independently from WTC since 2002. The number of participants is around 3500 individuals and 650 relay teams.

Course
The first part of the race, the 3.86 km swim event, takes place in the Rhine–Main–Danube Canal around 10 km outside Roth.

The 178.5 km bike ride uses a two-lap course on the countryside, mostly south of Roth. The southernmost point is Greding. The course is mostly relatively flat with a tougher hill once per lap.

The final marathon run goes once around a course with several turning points. Mostly the course goes on the same road after each turning points, so competitors meet each other. A major part of the course is along the Rhine–Main–Danube Canal. The finish is in central Roth.

Course Conditions 

In 2021 there were changes in the course which make comparing the results to other years difficult. Because of road construction, the bike portion of the race was shortened from 180km to roughly 170km.

World records set in Challenge Roth

 Men's record: Jan Frodeno, 2016  - 7:35:39 
 Women's record: Chrissie Wellington, 2011 - 8:18:13

Results

Men's results

Women's results

References

External links 
 
Challenge Roth's bicycle route at Openstreetmap

Triathlon competitions
Roth (district)